Walter Knabenhans (born 9 November 1929) is a Swiss rower. He competed in the men's coxless pair event at the 1960 Summer Olympics.

References

1929 births
Living people
Swiss male rowers
Olympic rowers of Switzerland
Rowers at the 1960 Summer Olympics
Rowers from Zürich